YTP may refer to:

 YouTube Poop, a type of video mashup
 YouTube Premium
 New Turkey Party (1961) ( or YTP), a defunct political party founded in 1961
 New Turkey Party (2002) ( or YTP), a defunct party founded in 2002 
 ISO 639:ytp, code for the Thopho language
 Yield to put (YTP), a variant of Yield to maturity of fixed-interest securities
 YTP, IATA code for the Tofino Harbour Water Aerodrome in British Columbia, Canada
Youth training programme